Baška tablet is one of the first monuments containing an inscription in the Croatian recension of the Church Slavonic language, dating from . The inscription is written in the Glagolitic script. It was discovered in 1851 near the village of Baška on the Croatian island of Krk.

History

The tablet was discovered in 1851 during paving of the Church of St. Lucy, Jurandvor near the village of Baška on the island of Krk.

Since 1934, the original tablet has been kept at the Croatian Academy of Sciences and Arts, Zagreb. Croatian archaeologist Branko Fučić contributed to the interpretation of Baška tablet as a left altar partition. His reconstruction of the text of the Baška tablet is the most widely accepted version today.

Description 
The Baška tablet is made of white limestone. It is 199 cm wide, 99.5 cm high, and 7.5–9 cm thick. It weighs approximately 800 kilograms. The tablet was believed to be installed as a partition between the altar and the rest of the church. A replica is in place in the church.

The inscribed stone slab records King Zvonimir's donation of a piece of land to a Benedictine abbey in the time of abbot Držiha. The second half of the inscription tells how Abbot Dobrovit built the church along with nine monks. The inscription is written in the Glagolitic script, exhibiting features of Church Slavonic of Croatian recension, such as writing (j)u for (j)ǫ, e for ę, i for y, and using one jer only (ъ). It provides the only example of transition from Glagolitic of the rounded Bulgarian type to the angular Croatian alphabet.

Contents 

The scholars who took part in deciphering of the Glagolitic text dealt with palaeographic challenges, as well as the problem of the damaged, worn-out surface of the slab. Through successive efforts, the contents were mostly interpreted before World War I, but remained a topic of study throughout the 20th century.

The original text, with unreadable segments marked gray:

The transliterated text, according to Branko Fučić, with restored segments in square brackets, is as follows:

Dating

The tablet's content suggests it was inscribed after the death of King Zvonimir in 1089, since abbot Držiha describes Zvonimir's donation as an event that happened further in the past ("in his days"). The Church of St. Lucy, described as having been built during the reign of prince Cosmas, indicates an era before the Venetian rule on Krk, starting in 1116. This, along with the Romanesque features of the church, dates the tablet to the late 11th or early 12th century.

The meaning of the opening lines is contested. While some scholars interpret the introductory characters simply as Azъ ("I"), others believe that letters were also used to encode the year. There is no agreement, however, on the interpretation: 1100, 1077, 1079, 1105 and 1120 have been proposed.

Significance
The name of Croatia and King Zvonimir are mentioned on the tablet for the first time in Croatian.

Despite the fact of not being the oldest Croatian Glagolitic monument (the Plomin tablet, Valun tablet, Krk 
inscription, are older and appeared in the 11th century) and in spite of the fact that it was not written in the pure Croatian vernacular - it has nevertheless been referred to by Stjepan Ivšić as "the jewel" of Croatian, while Stjepan Damjanović called it "the baptismal certificate of Croatian culture". It features a vaguely damaged ornamental string pattern, the Croatian interlace.

The tablet was depicted on the obverse of the Croatian 100 kuna banknote, issued in 1993 and 2002, and on a postage stamp issued by Croatian Post in 2000.

References

Bibliography

Further reading 

 
 

Croatian culture
Old Croatian inscriptions
1100 in Europe
11th century in Croatia
Krk
Croatian glagolithic texts
11th-century inscriptions
Church Slavonic literature